Bajs may refer to:
Damir Bajs (born 1964), Croatian politician
British Association for Jewish Studies, a UK organisation promoting the scholarly study of Jewish culture
British Association for Japanese Studies, a UK organisation promoting Japanese studies
Gunjac, a Croatian violincello like instrument with two strings